Enrique García Álvarez may refer to:
Enrique García Álvarez (actor)
Enrique García Álvarez (playwright)